Phalen is a surname. Notable people with the surname include: 

Dennis T. Phalen (1856-1922), American politician
Edward Phelan (c.1811-1850), early settler of Saint Paul, Minnesota, US
Lake Phalen, a lake in Saint Paul, Minnesota 
Eugene A. Phalen (1876–1940), American businessman and politician
George S. Phalen (1911–1998), American hand surgeon
Phalen maneuver, a diagnostic test for carpal tunnel syndrome
Gerard Phalen (born 1934), Canadian politician, educator, and union leader
Robert Phalen (born 1937), American actor